The fourth season of the American crime and action drama Magnum P.I. premiered on October 1, 2021 on CBS, for the 2021–22 television season. It concluded on May 6, 2022. The series is a remake of the 1980 series of the same name and centers on Thomas Magnum, a former Navy SEAL who works as a private investigator and solves mysteries with his business partner Juliet Higgins and other friends. It stars Jay Hernandez, Perdita Weeks, Zachary Knighton, Stephen Hill, Amy Hill, and Tim Kang. The season was ordered on April 15, 2021 and consisted of twenty episodes. On May 12, 2022, it was announced that CBS had canceled the series after four seasons, however, on June 30, 2022, the series was picked up by NBC with a two-season, twenty-episode order. Dennis Chun appeared in the sixteenth episode of the season as his Hawaii Five-0 character in a minor crossover event. The season premiere, "Island Vibes", was watched by 5.23 million viewers.

Cast and characters

Main
 Jay Hernandez as Thomas Magnum, a former Navy SEAL who is a security consultant for the successful novelist Robin Masters, living in the guest house on his estate, while also working as a private investigator
 Perdita Weeks as Juliet Higgins, a former MI6 agent who is majordomo to Robin Masters; she and Magnum bicker but become allies
 Zachary Knighton as Orville "Rick" Wright, a Marine veteran and former door gunner, who runs his own tiki bar and is also a playboy
 Stephen Hill as Theodore "T.C." Calvin, a Marine veteran and helicopter pilot who runs helicopter tours of Hawaii and is a member of Magnum's team
 Amy Hill as Teuila "Kumu" Tuileta, the cultural curator of Robin Masters' estate
 Tim Kang as Honolulu Police Department (HPD) Detective Gordon Katsumoto, who dislikes Magnum but usually comes to the team's aid when needed

Recurring
 Martin Martinez as Cade Jensen
 Christopher Thornton as Kenny "Shammy" Shamberg
 Jay Ali as Ethan Shah
 Chantal Thuy as HPD Detective Lia Kaleo
 Bobby Lee as Jin Jeong
 Marsha Thomason as Eve
 Betsy Phillips as Suzy

Notable guests
 Sebastian Roché as Zev Marker
 Robert Baker as Randall
 Kaylee Hottle as Joon, Jin's niece
 Nikki Hahn as Amanda Davis
 Devon Sawa as Robbie Nelson
 Greg Ellis as Sean Cavendish
 Brooke Nevin as Emily
 Levy Tran as Tia Min
 Maya Stojan as Maya
 Domenick Lombardozzi as Sebastian Nuzo
 Janel Parrish as Maleah
 Parker Queenan as Ryder Simmons
 Emily Alana as Mahina, a firefighter
 Hala Finley as Ella Vaughn
 Niall Matter as Cole Vaughn
 Robert Pine as Daniel "Danny" Braddock
 Max Gail as Bob Braddock

Crossover

 Dennis Chun as HPD Sergeant Duke Lukela

Episodes

The number in the "No. overall" column refers to the episode's number within the overall series, whereas the number in the "No. in season" column refers to the episode's number within this particular season. Numerous episodes are named after similarly named episodes from the original series. "Production code" refers to the order in which the episodes were produced while "U.S. viewers (millions)" refers to the number of viewers in the U.S. in millions who watched the episode as it was aired.

Crossovers

Despite Hawaii Five-0 ending in 2020, Dennis Chun still made a guest appearance in the sixteenth episode of the season as his Hawaii Five-0 character, Honolulu Police Department Sergeant Duke Lukela, after making a guest appearance in all three previous seasons of Magnum P.I.

Production

Development
On April 15, 2021, it was announced that CBS had renewed Magnum P.I. for a fourth season. This came following the announcement that MacGyver had been canceled after five seasons, leaving Magnum P.I. as the last remaining series in the Lenkov-verse. The series' writers have confirmed that it will be a full season consisting of eighteen to twenty-two episodes, later stating it will be twenty. Christopher Duddy joined the series as the director of photography after previously doing the same job on MacGyver. Multiple crew members left the series prior to the season to work on NCIS: Hawaiʻi. On May 12, 2022, CBS canceled the series after four seasons, however, on June 30, 2022, the series was picked up by NBC with a two-season, twenty-episode order.

Casting
On August 27, 2021, it was announced that Chantal Thuy had been cast in an undisclosed capacity as Lia Kaleo, an HPD detective who is Katsumoto's partner and Magnum's secret girlfriend. On September 28, 2021, Martin Martinez was cast in a recurring role as Cade Jensen, a troubled teenager looking for a job at La Mariana who ends up bonding with T.C.  On December 30, 2021, it was reported that Levy Tran had been cast in a guest-starring role as Tia Min, a bodyguard for a powerful crime lord. Tran previously portrayed a different character as a series regular on MacGyver. Christopher Thornton, Bobby Lee, and Jay Ali returned as Kenny "Shammy" Shamberg, Jin Jeong, and Ethan Shah, respectively, after being introduced in previous seasons.

Filming
Filming for the season began July 20, 2021, with a traditional Hawaiian blessing. Filming concluded on March 9, 2022.

Marketing and release
In May 2021, it was confirmed that Magnum P.I. would keep the timeslot it held for previous two seasons of Fridays at 9:00 PM ET. On July 12, 2021, the season was revealed to be premiering on October 1, 2021. The series continues to lead into Blue Bloods and follows S.W.A.T. and Undercover Boss.

Viewing figures

Home media

References

2021 American television seasons
2022 American television seasons
Magnum, P.I.